Catherine Elizabeth Pugh (born March 10, 1950) is an American former politician. A member of the Democratic Party, she served as the 51st mayor of Baltimore from 2016 to 2019, when she resigned amid a scandal that eventually led to criminal charges, three years in prison, and three years probation. Pugh became involved in Maryland politics in 1999, when she was elected to the Baltimore City Council. She also held office in the Maryland House of Delegates and the Maryland Senate, serving as the Majority Leader from 2015 to 2016. She first ran for Baltimore mayor in 2011 and lost the primary to Stephanie Rawlings-Blake. Pugh ran again in 2016 and won the primary against former Mayor Sheila Dixon. Pugh then won the mayoral election on November 8, 2016, with 57% of the popular vote, and took office on December 6, 2016. She was Baltimore's third consecutive female mayor.

In April 2019, Pugh announced she was taking an indefinite leave of absence to recover from pneumonia. The announcement coincided with a scandal over a "self-dealing" book-sales arrangement, whereby organizations purchased large quantities of Pugh's books in exchange for contracts with the city. On May 2, 2019, Pugh resigned as Mayor of Baltimore amid the book scandal and on November 20, 2019, she was indicted by a grand jury on eleven counts, including tax evasion, fraud, and conspiracy in connection with the book transactions. The following day she signed a plea agreement, pleading guilty to four charges of conspiracy and tax evasion. On February 27, 2020, Pugh was sentenced to 3 years in prison to be followed by 3 years of probation. As of January 26, 2022, Pugh had been released from federal prison in Alabama and transferred to a Baltimore halfway house.

Early life 
Pugh was born as Catherine Crump on March 10, 1950, in Norristown, Pennsylvania. Pugh was raised in Philadelphia, Pennsylvania, with her seven siblings. In 1967, she graduated from Overbrook High School in Philadelphia.

Education 
Pugh earned a Bachelor of Science and Master of Business Administration from Morgan State University in Baltimore City, Maryland. She is a member of Delta Sigma Theta sorority.

Early career
In 1977 Pugh began teaching Marketing and Introduction to Business at Morgan State University. In 1988, Pugh founded a public relations firm, Pugh and Company. From the mid-1980s to the early 1990s, she was an independent editor for The Baltimore Sun and dean and director of Strayer Business College in Baltimore. In 1994, she returned to Philadelphia and became vice president of Brunson Communications and co-owner of a local Delaware Valley TV station, WGTW-TV, where she was the host of "Another View", a weekly public affairs program that focused on policy issues within the black community and featured interviews with community leaders and public officials.

Political career
Pugh entered Baltimore City politics in 1999. She is president and CEO of Pugh and Company, and in December 2016 became the 51st mayor of Baltimore City, Maryland.

Baltimore City Council
In 1999 Pugh was elected to the Baltimore City Council, where she served until 2004. She ran for president of the council in 2003, but lost to Sheila Dixon in the primary.

Maryland General Assembly

In 2005, Governor Bob Ehrlich appointed Pugh to an open seat in the Maryland House of Delegates, where she served from June 21, 2005, to January 10, 2007. She then won a seat in the State Senate and served there from January 10, 2007 to December 6, 2016. She sat on the Finance Committee and served as the State Senate Majority Leader. As Majority Leader, Pugh led the state on cyber security and telemedicine expansion legislation. Pugh is also responsible for diversifying the state's $40 billion pension portfolio, having led the passage of Senate Bill 606, which increased black and other minority managed dollars from $300 million to $4.2 billion. Pugh is a former president of the National Black Caucus of State Legislators and she's the past chair of the Legislative Black Caucus of Maryland and the Women's Caucus of Legislators in Maryland.

2016 Baltimore mayoral campaign

In 2015, Pugh entered the race for mayor of Baltimore and launched her campaign headquarters in the city. She was an underdog to former mayor Sheila Dixon until the early 2016. The endorsement of Congressman Elijah Cummings in April 2016 boosted her campaigning efforts. Pugh won the Democratic primary, with 37% of the vote to Dixon's 34%. The Democratic primary has long been the real contest in Baltimore, where Democrats outnumber Republicans 10-to-1, so Pugh was overwhelmingly favored in the general election. She won the November 8 general election with 57% of the vote, and took office on December 6, 2016.

Mayor of Baltimore
Pugh succeeded Stephanie Rawlings-Blake as Baltimore's 51st mayor. As mayor, she inherited several issues from the Rawlings-Blake administration. Pugh prioritized the United States Department of Justice investigation into the Baltimore Police Department following the death of Freddie Gray, before the inauguration of Donald Trump. In April 2017, Judge James K. Bredar approved the consent decree signed by Pugh and former acting U.S. Assistant Attorney General Vanita Gupta, rejecting an objection by new U.S. Attorney General Jeff Sessions.

Additional issues the Pugh administration faced included Baltimore's crime levels, vacant housing and revitalization development, and the cancellation of the Baltimore Red Line and launch of Governor Larry Hogan's BaltimoreLink bus system overhaul. Despite supporting it during her campaign, Pugh vetoed a bill to increase Baltimore's minimum wage to $15 per hour over five years, citing concerns about businesses moving out of the city and adverse effects on nonprofits and small businesses. Ricarra Jones, chairwoman of the Fight for $15 Baltimore Coalition, responded to the veto, "As a state senator, Mayor Pugh was a strong supporter of a livable minimum wage and explicitly promised to sign the Baltimore wage bill as mayor. Today, she has made clear that promises are made to be broken."

In July 2017, Pugh along with other city leaders announced a mandatory one-year sentence for illegal possession of a gun in many parts of Baltimore. The move was seen as an attempt to address the city's soaring violence rate. The Baltimore city council voted to water down the legislation.

Resignation and criminal charges

In March 2019, Pugh agreed to accept $500,000 from the University of Maryland Medical System while serving as a trustee to purchase her Healthy Holly self-published books to donate to Baltimore schoolchildren. This no-bid payment was controversial because the years of payments coincided with her tenure as head of a health committee in the Maryland State Senate and as mayor of Baltimore. She did not disclose the payments or recuse herself from votes and decisions involving the medical system. Maryland legislative leaders pledged to reform the medical center's practice of giving large contracts to trustees due to the conflict it poses to their decision-making, which includes approving a $4 million salary to the institution's CEO. Pugh received $500,000 from the University of Maryland Medical System (UMMS) for 100,000 copies of her books. However, the firm printing the publication confirmed it had only printed 60,000 copies.

Pugh initially said that the University of Maryland Medical System were her only book sales, but on April 1, 2019, the Baltimore Sun reported that Kaiser Permanente paid more than $100,000 for copies of the book, and a nonprofit called Associated Black Charities paid Pugh's organization nearly $80,000 for copies of the book. Both organizations do business with the city of Baltimore. Associated Black Charities in turn resold some of its copies to other organizations, including CareFirst BlueCross BlueShield, another Baltimore insurer.

On April 8, 2019, all members of the Baltimore City Council signed a memorandum calling for Pugh to resign as mayor. Pugh said she intended to return to office following her leave of absence due to illness.

On April 25, 2019, FBI and IRS agents raided six locations, including two houses owned by Pugh, Baltimore City Hall, and a nonprofit organization on whose board Pugh served.

On May 2, 2019, Pugh resigned as Mayor of Baltimore. On November 20, 2019, she was indicted by a grand jury on 11 counts of fraud, tax evasion, and conspiracy in connection with the Healthy Holly book transactions. The following day she signed a plea agreement, admitting guilt on four counts of tax evasion and conspiracy.

Sentencing 
On February 27, 2020, Pugh was sentenced to three years in prison to be followed by three years of probation. U.S. District Judge Deborah K. Chasanow ordered Pugh to pay $412,000 in restitution. Additionally, Pugh will forfeit nearly $670,000, including her Ashburton home and the remaining balance of her campaign account totaling $17,800. Pugh has also agreed that all copies of Healthy Holly in government custody will be destroyed. She was granted several extensions to delay the start of her prison sentence. On June 26, 2020, Pugh reported to prison at Federal Correctional Institution, Aliceville, Alabama.
According to the Federal Bureau of Prison inmate system, Pugh was released on April 1, 2022.

Personal life
Pugh married her husband Phillip in 1973, and they divorced two years later; she has no children. She lives in Baltimore's Ashburton neighborhood in the Forest Park area of Northwest Baltimore City.

A runner and fitness enthusiast, Pugh has written a series of children's health books called Mind Garden: Where Thoughts Grow and Healthy Holly, which advocate exercise and healthy eating. She is also the founder of community programs, such as the Baltimore Marathon; the Fish Out of Water Project, a program that promotes tourism in Baltimore City to raise money for arts programs for local youth; and the Need to Read Campaign, a program designed to help Baltimore residents improve their reading skills.

See also
 List of mayors of Baltimore

References

External links

 
 

|-

1950 births
21st-century American politicians
21st-century American women politicians
African-American mayors in Maryland
African-American state legislators in Maryland
Baltimore City Council members
Living people
Democratic Party Maryland state senators
Mayors of Baltimore
Morgan State University alumni
People from Norristown, Pennsylvania
Women mayors of places in Maryland
Women state legislators in Maryland
Maryland politicians convicted of crimes
21st-century American criminals
American female criminals
Criminals from Pennsylvania
American people convicted of tax crimes
American politicians convicted of fraud
20th-century American politicians
Morgan State University faculty
African-American city council members in Maryland
Women city councillors in Maryland
20th-century American women politicians
American women academics
20th-century African-American women
21st-century African-American women
21st-century African-American politicians
Candidates in the 2011 United States elections
African-American women mayors